Cordyline obtecta (Ti, Norfolk Island cabbage tree, Three Kings cabbage tree) is a widely branching monocot tree native to Norfolk Island (the type locality), and to northern New Zealand. The species name obtecta derives from the Latin obtegere (to conceal, to cover up), alluding to the way the inflorescence barely protruded beyond the leaves in the plant first described.

Distribution
On Norfolk Island, C. obtecta grows in forest on Mt Bates, Mt Pitt, and elsewhere in the National Park. In New Zealand it was first described as C. kaspar and was thought to be restricted to the Three Kings Islands, 55 km north of the North Island. Later it was found on the North Island at North Cape, and on Murimotu Island and the Poor Knights Islands. In 2005, C. kaspar was relegated to synonymy with C. obtecta.

Description
It has spreading branches covered with densely clustered stiff leaves that appear in tufts at the tips of the branches. The leaves droop somewhat as they age. The flowers of C. obtecta are borne in many large, open branched panicles that appear among the leaves. The fruit is a spherical berry  in diameter, whitish or purplish blue. The bark on the trunk is grey and flaky.

Threats
On Norfolk Island many populations of C. obtecta are threatened outside the national park, and it is listed as 'vulnerable' under the Australian Environment Protection and Biodiversity Conservation Act 1999 The New Zealand Plant Conservation Network lists the plant as 'At Risk/Range Restricted'. It also occasionally hybridises in New Zealand with C. australis, the characteristics of the resultant plants being intermediate to those of the parents.

Cultivation
C. obtecta is an attractive small tree which tolerates full sun but prefers shade when young. It is intolerant of wet conditions and is likely to be sensitive to frost. There are at least two commercially available cultivars which are becoming popular for street planting and for home gardens. 'Green Goddess'  (probably of Three Kings origin) has slightly glaucous, matte-surfaced leaves and stiffly upright fruit panicles. 'Emerald Goddess' (probably from Norfolk Island) has glossy grass-green leaves and lax panicles.

Notes

References
Salmon J T, The Native Trees of New Zealand, AH & AW Reed, Wellington, New Zealand, 1973. 

Asparagales of Australia
obtecta
Trees of Australia
Trees of New Zealand
Flora of Norfolk Island
Flora of the North Island
Taxa named by Robert Graham